Elma Kenechukwu Mbadiwe  is a Nigerian actress.

Education 
Mbadiwe obtained a bachelor's degree in Mass Communication from The Redeemer's University Nigeria, Ede, Osun State. She also has a diploma in Acting for Screen from Royal Arts Academy, Surulere, Lagos.

Career 
Before Mbadiwe delved into acting, she worked as a writer at Consolidated Media, the media house for SoundCity. She also worked in the production department.

Her acting career started in 2016, and her first movie was The Audition. She played the lead role, Talullah, in Unbroken, which brought her to the limelight because of the attention she got from fans. She also featured as Laraba in E.V.E. Both movies were produced by African Magic Production. She has starred alongside other Nollywood actors in movies including Rattlesnake: The Ahanna Story and Dysfunction.

Filmography

Accolades 

Mbadiwe was nominated for Best Upcoming Actress at the 2018 edition of the Best of Nollywood Awards. The nomination was for her role in the LGBT movie We Don't Live Here Anymore, which received 11 nominations.

See also
 List of Nigerian actors
 Rattlesnake: The Ahanna Story

References

External links 
 

Living people
Year of birth missing (living people)
Igbo actresses
21st-century Nigerian actresses
Actresses from Imo State
Redeemer's University Nigeria alumni
Nigerian film actresses
Nigerian models